Elk-Lake Serenade is the fourth album by Canadian singer-songwriter Hayden.  It was released on 18 May 2004 in Canada (on Hayden's own record label, Hardwood Records) and in the U.S. (on the Badman Recording Co.). It was released two months later in the UK on Loose Music, and in Australia and New Zealand on Spunk Records.

Elk Lake is a community in Northern Ontario.

Track listing
All songs written by Paul Hayden Desser.

 "Wide Eyes" – 2:12
 "Home by Saturday" – 3:19
 "Woody" – 1:53
 "This Summer" – 2:56
 "Hollywood Ending" – 2:55
 "Robbed Blind" – 2:17
 "Killbear" – 3:34
 "Through the Rads" – 1:19
 "Starting Over" – 2:31
 "Don't Get Down" – 3:19
 "Roll Down That Wave" – 1:38
 "My Wife" – 3:02
 "1939" – 4:45
 "Elk-Lake Serenade" – 1:01
 "Looking Back to Me" – 5:21
 hidden track – 4:19 (begins approx. 2:14 after "Looking Back to Me")

Hayden (musician) albums
2004 albums